The 2017 Internazionali di Tennis Città di Perugia was a professional tennis tournament played on clay courts. It was the third edition of the tournament which was part of the 2017 ATP Challenger Tour. It took place in Perugia, Italy between 11 and 16 July 2017.

Singles main-draw entrants

Seeds

 1 Rankings are as of 3 July 2017.

Other entrants
The following players received wildcards into the singles main draw:
  Andrea Arnaboldi
  Matteo Donati
  Marcel Granollers
  Gian Marco Moroni

The following player received entry into the singles main draw using a protected ranking:
  Daniel Muñoz de la Nava

The following players received entry into the singles main draw as alternates:
  Benjamin Bonzi
  Salvatore Caruso
  Luca Vanni

The following players received entry from the qualifying draw:
  Gianluca Di Nicola
  Moez Echargui
  Gonzalo Escobar
  Juan Pablo Paz

Champions

Singles

  Laslo Đere def.  Daniel Muñoz de la Nava 7–6(7–2), 6–4.

Doubles

  Salvatore Caruso /  Jonathan Eysseric def.  Nicolás Kicker /  Fabrício Neis 6–3, 6–3.

References

Internazionali di Tennis Città di Perugia
2017
July 2017 sports events in Italy
2017 in Italian tennis